Arenostola is a genus of moths of the family Noctuidae.

Species
 Arenostola phragmitidis – fen wainscot (Hübner, [1803])
 Arenostola taurica (Staudinger, 1899)
 Arenostola unicolor Warren, 1914
 Arenostola zernyi (Schwingenschuss, 1935)

References
 Arenostola at Markku Savela's Lepidoptera and Some Other Life Forms
 Natural History Museum Lepidoptera genus database

Acronictinae